Short Titles Act (with its variations) is a stock short title used for legislation in Ireland and the United Kingdom which retroactively confers short titles on a large number of earlier pieces of legislation. The Bill for an Act with this short title will have been known as a Short Titles Bill during its passage through Parliament.

Halsbury's Laws said that Short Titles Acts are law reform Acts.

In modern times, an Act will authorize a short title to refer to itself, and occasionally additional or alternative short titles are provided, as for example the Senior Courts Act 1981.

List

Ireland
The Short Titles Act 1962
The Short Titles Acts 1896 to 2007 is the collective title of the Short Titles Act 1896, the Short Titles Act 1962, and sections 4 to 7 and 10(2) of, and in so far as it relates to section 4, Schedule 1 to, the Statute Law Revision Act 2007.
The Short Titles Acts 1896 to 2009 is the collective title of the Short Titles Acts 1896 to 2007 and sections 4 and 5 and 7(2) of, and in so far as it relates to section 4, Schedule 1 to, the Statute Law Revision Act 2009.
The Short Titles Acts 1896 to 2012 is the collective title of the Short Titles Acts 1896 to 2009 and sections 4 and 5 and 8(3) of, and in so far as it relates to section 4, Schedule 1 to, the Statute Law Revision Act 2012.

United Kingdom
The Short Titles Act 1892 (55 & 56 Vict. c. 10)
The Short Titles Act 1896 (59 & 60 Vict. c. 14)
The Statute Law Revision Act 1948 (11 & 12 Geo. 6 c. 62) under section 5 and the Second Schedule
The Short Titles Act (Northern Ireland) 1951 (c. 1) (N.I.)
The Statute Law Revision (Scotland) Act 1964 (1964 c. 80) under section 2 and Schedule 2
The Statute Law (Repeals) Act 1977 (1977 c. 18) under section 3 and Schedule 3
The Statute Law (Repeals) Act 1978 (1978 c. 45) under section 2 and Schedule 3

See also
List of short titles

References

Lists of legislation by short title
Westminster system